Christian Anthony Norton (born 21 May 2001) is a professional footballer who plays as a forward for Cheltenham Town. Born in England, he represented Wales internationally.

Career

Stoke City
Norton began his career at Southampton and made his senior debut with the under-23 team on 9 October 2018 in the EFL Trophy against Cambridge United. He was released at the end of the 2019–20 season. Norton went on trial at Stoke City in October 2020 and joined their U23 squad in November 2020. Norton made his English Football League debut on 16 March 2021 in a 0–0 draw against Cardiff City. He was give his first start by Michael O'Neill on 17 April against Preston North End.

On 31 August 2021, Norton joined EFL League One side Cheltenham Town on loan until January 2022. Norton made 14 appearances for the Robins before returning to Stoke. He was released by Stoke at the end of the 2021–22 season.

Cheltenham Town
On 12 August 2022, Norton signed a one-year contract with Cheltenham Town.

International career
He was selected for the Wales under-21 squad for the friendly match against Republic of Ireland on 25 March 2021.

Career statistics

References

2001 births
Living people
Footballers from Greater London
Welsh footballers
Wales youth international footballers
English footballers
English people of Welsh descent
Southampton F.C. players
Stoke City F.C. players
Cheltenham Town F.C. players
English Football League players
Association football forwards